Berit Hynne (born 10 December 1979) is a Norwegian handball player who played for the club Levanger HK and for the Norway women's national handball team.

She competed at the 2003 World Women's Handball Championship, and played a total of 18 matches for the national team during her career.

References

External links 
 

1979 births
Living people
Norwegian female handball players